Marie-Hélène Thoraval (born 3 June 1966 in Coutances) is a French politician who has been serving as Mayor of Romans-sur-Isère since 2014 and as a member of the Regional council of Auvergne-Rhône-Alpes since 2016.

Political career
Thoraval was a member of the National Assembly of France from 2010 to 2012. She was the substitute candidate for Gabriel Biancheri in the 2007 French legislative election in Drôme's 4th constituency. She succeeded Biancheri following
his death in 2010.  

Thoraval is a member of the Union for a Popular Movement.

Political positions
In 2019, Thoraval publicly declared her support for incumbent President Emmanuel Macron.

References

External links
Official website

1966 births
Living people
People from Coutances
Mayors of places in Auvergne-Rhône-Alpes
Union for a Popular Movement politicians
The Republicans (France) politicians
Deputies of the 13th National Assembly of the French Fifth Republic
Regional councillors of Auvergne-Rhône-Alpes
Women members of the National Assembly (France)
21st-century French women politicians